Amber Evangeline Valletta (born February 9, 1974) is an American model and actress. She began her career as a fashion model, landing her first of sixteen American Vogue covers at the age of eighteen. During the 1990s, Valletta reached the status of supermodel, working as the face of Giorgio Armani, Chanel, Escada, Louis Vuitton, Prada, Valentino, Gucci and Versace, and signing multimillion-dollar cosmetics contracts with Calvin Klein and Elizabeth Arden. From 1995 to 1996, Valletta and her friend and fellow model Shalom Harlow hosted the MTV show House of Style.

In the 2000s, Valletta began to focus on her career as an actress. She had her first major film role as a poltergeist in Robert Zemeckis's supernatural thriller What Lies Beneath (2000). She has since appeared in films such as Hitch (2005), Transporter 2 (2005), Man About Town (2006), Dead Silence (2007), Gamer (2009), and The Spy Next Door (2010). In 2011, she moved to television, appearing in a recurring role as the fallen socialite Lydia Davis on ABC's drama television series Revenge. In 2015, Valletta starred as the scheming Carla Briggs in another ABC soap opera, Blood & Oil.

Early life
Amber Evangeline Valletta was born in Phoenix, Arizona and raised in Tulsa, Oklahoma. Her mother, Theresa Malaby, worked at the post office. Her father is of Italian and Portuguese descent, and her mother identifies as having English and part Cherokee ancestry.

Career

Modeling 
Valletta got her start in the fashion industry when her mother enrolled her in modeling school at the age of 15 at the Linda Layman Agency. Valletta, along with the likes of Kate Moss, Eva Herzigová, Tyra Banks, Carolyn Murphy and Shalom Harlow, was one of the most recognizable faces of the generation immediately subsequent to the original supermodels. During the 1990s she appeared 13 times on the cover of American Vogue, second only to Claudia Schiffer's sixteen. Valletta was presented on the November 1999 Millennium cover of American Vogue as one of the "Modern Muses".

She has appeared on the cover of several international fashion magazines, such as Germany's Cosmopolitan and Glamour; Spain's Elle, Telva and Harper's Bazaar; UK's Esquire and Love and US' V, Porter, Interview, Ocean Drive, Shape, Allure, Marie Claire and i-D. Valletta has walked in fashion shows for Versace, Lanvin, Louis Vuitton, Balenciaga, Gucci, Valentino, Prada, Michael Kors, Alberta Ferretti, Claude Montana, Dolce & Gabbana, Pierre Balmain, Sonia Rykiel, Versus, Yohji Yamamoto, Anna Molinari, Calvin Klein, Christian Dior and Tom Ford. She was the face of NARS Cosmetics' Spring 2010 Collection.

Valletta also continued to work with photographer Steven Meisel. Not only was she selected by Steven Meisel for the 2014 50th Anniversary Cover of Italian Vogue but one of her prior Italian Vogue editorials with super model Tracy James and photographed by Meisel was selected as one of Italian Vogues most Iconic photos.

Valletta continues to work as a fashion model, closing the Versace Autumn/Winter 2017 fashion show. She was also model for Marks and Spencer. In 2018, Valletta appeared in advertisements for Mango, Blumarine, Escada, Chanel Watches, Prada and David Yurman. In 2019, she appeared on the cover of Vogue Korea and U.S. Elle, advertising campaigns for Stella McCartney and Holt Renfrew, and editorials for Italian, American and Arabian Vogue.

Acting
Valletta's first role was in the comedy film Drop Back Ten (2000). Later that year, she played a supporting role in the thriller film What Lies Beneath, starring Harrison Ford and Michelle Pfeiffer and directed by Robert Zemeckis. She appeared alongside Nicolas Cage in The Family Man. In 2003, she played Celine in Danny DeVito's Duplex, starring Ben Stiller and Drew Barrymore, and in 2004, she played Martina in Raising Helen, opposite Kate Hudson, Hayden Panettiere, Abigail Breslin, and Helen Mirren.

Valletta's first major film role was as Allegra Cole in Andy Tennant's romantic comedy Hitch. The film was released on February 11, 2005, and was a box office and critical success. She also had a role in Transporter 2, playing the mother of the kidnapped child. She played the female lead in the 2006 independent film The Last Time, co-starring alongside Michael Keaton and Brendan Fraser. In 2007, she had supporting roles in the horror film Dead Silence, as Ella Ashen, and as Claire in Premonition, starring Sandra Bullock. Also in 2007, Valletta played the leading role in the independent coming-of-age film My Sexiest Year.

In 2009, Valletta starred alongside Gerard Butler in the science fiction action film Gamer. The film was released in North America on September 4, 2009, to negative reviews from critics. In 2010, she starred in The Spy Next Door, alongside Jackie Chan, George Lopez, and Billy Ray Cyrus; she played Chan's character's love interest, Gillian. In 2011, she appeared in the ensemble comedy film Girl Walks into a Bar.

In 2011, Valletta was cast in the recurring role as the socialite Lydia Davis on the ABC television prime time soap opera Revenge. In 2014, she was a regular cast member in the TNT crime drama series Legends, playing Sean Bean's character's ex-wife. In 2015, Valletta starred in the short-lived ABC prime-time soap opera Blood & Oil. She played Carla Briggs, the glamorous business partner and new wife of oil tycoon Hap Briggs (Don Johnson).

In 2016, Valletta starred in the video for Keith Urban's song "Blue Ain't Your Color",  directed by Carter Smith. She also starred in the video for Fergie's song "M.I.L.F. $".

Other projects
Valletta serves as the spokesperson for Oceana's Seafood Contamination Campaign, to raise awareness of the dangers of mercury poisoning in various kinds of seafood. The decision to join Oceana's campaign was prompted by the mercury-poisoning experience of a friend and the fact that she is a mother.

Personal life

Valletta married Hervé Le Bihan in 1994, divorcing in 1996. In 2000, Valletta had a son with Olympic volleyball player Chip McCaw.  She married McCaw, in September 2003, and they divorced in early 2015.

Valletta endorsed incumbent Democratic President Barack Obama for re-election in 2012.

In July 2014, Valletta spoke out about her battle with drug and alcohol addiction.

Filmography

Film

Television

Music videos

References

External links
 
 

1974 births
Living people
American people of Portuguese descent
American people of Italian descent
American people who self-identify as being of Native American descent
American film actresses
American television actresses
American television personalities
American women television personalities
IMG Models models
20th-century American actresses
21st-century American actresses
American soap opera actresses
Female models from Arizona
Actresses from Tulsa, Oklahoma
Actresses from Phoenix, Arizona
Booker T. Washington High School (Tulsa, Oklahoma) alumni
The Society Management models